The 1997 Kansas State Wildcats football team represented Kansas State University in the 1997 NCAA Division I-A football season.  The team's head football coach was Bill Snyder.  The Wildcats played their home games in KSU Stadium.  1997 saw the Wildcats finish with a record of 11–1, and a 7–1 record in Big 12 Conference play.  The season ended with a win over Donovan McNabb's Syracuse Orangemen in the 1997 Fiesta Bowl.

Schedule

Roster

Game summaries

Nebraska

Texas A&M

Syracuse (Fiesta Bowl)

Rankings

References

Kansas State
Kansas State Wildcats football seasons
Fiesta Bowl champion seasons
Kansas State Wildcats football